It's Country Time Again! is an album by American country music artists George Jones and Gene Pitney released in 1966 on the Musicor Records label.

Background
It's Country Time Again is the sequel to For the First Time! Two Great Stars - George Jones and Gene Pitney, released the year before.  It was not as successful as its predecessor, however, rising only to number 13.  The album is noteworthy for featuring the Jones hits "Love Bug", "My Favorite Lies" and a duet of "Why Baby Why", Jones first hit from 1955.  It's Country Time Again also includes "That's All It Took", a song that Jones fanatic Gram Parsons would record with Emmylou Harris on his debut album GP in 1973.

The Bear Family record label would reissue both albums under the title George Jones & Gene Pitney, collecting 31 sides that the pair recorded together.

Track listing 
 "Mockin' Bird Hill" (Vaughn Horton)
 "As Long as I Live" (Roy Acuff)
 "My Favorite Lies"(George Jones, Jack Ripley)
 "Y'all Come" (Arlie Duff)
 "Someday (You'll Want Me to Want You)" (Jimmy Hodges)
 "Love Bug" (Wayne Kemp, Curtis Wayne)
 "Big Job" (Jones, Hank Mills)
 "Your Old Standby" (Jim Eanes, Wayne Perry)
 "Why Baby Why" (Jones, Darrell Edwards)
 "That's All It Took" (Jones, Darrell Edwards, C. Grier)
 "Louisiana Man" (Doug Kershaw)
 "I Can't Stop Loving You" (Don Gibson)

Chart positions
Album – Billboard (United States)

References

External links
George Jones' Official Website
LP Discography entry for It's Country Time Again

1966 albums
George Jones albums
Gene Pitney albums
Musicor Records albums
Albums produced by Pappy Daily
Vocal duet albums